The Couvent Saint-Jacques, Grand couvent des Jacobins or Couvent des Jacobins de la rue Saint-Jacques was a Dominican monastery on rue Saint-Jacques in Paris. Its complex was between what are now rue Soufflot and rue Cujas. Its teaching activities were the origin of the collège des Jacobins, a college of the historic University of Paris.

History 
 
The Dominican order established a base in Paris in 1217 in a house near Notre-Dame.<ref>Antony Béraud, Pierre-Joseph-Spiridion Dufey, Dictionnarie historique de Paris', 566.  https://books.google.com/books?id=yW4sAQAAIAAJ&pg=PA366  Accessed 2-20-2013</ref>  In 1218 Jean Barastre (also known as Jean de Saint-Quentin, theology professor and doctor to Philip II of France) gave the order a house with a chapel near the city walls. This chapel was the chapel of a pilgrims' hospice - dedicated to Saint James the Great, it gave its name to rue Saint-Jacques and to the French Dominicans, who became known as the 'Jacobins' after their main monastery.

Major benefactions from Louis IX of France allowed the order to complete its church and build a dormitory and schools. In 1245, the Talmud was translated into Latin by the Jacobins. Although limited by the city wall and in competition with the other great monastery-college in Paris, the Cordeliers, the Dominicans expanded up to the wall of Philip II Augustus thanks to Louis XII of France.

A wealthy merchant named Hennequin gave the order a gift in 1556 which enabled it to rebuild its cloister. Its study room, known as the Écoles Saint-Thomas, was also rebuilt in 1563. A few years before the French Revolution this room was used for services, since the church was closed and in disrepair. The monastery was suppressed in 1790 and its buildings demolished between 1800 and 1849.

 Burials 

The monastery church housed many notable tombs.

 Royal and princely tombs 
Charles, Count of Valois, son of Philip III of France, founder of the house of Valois,
Charles II, Count of Alençon, son of the former, 
Maria de La Cerda y Lara, second wife of the former,
Agnes, seventh daughter of John II of France,
Louis, Count of Évreux, son of Philip III of France,
Margaret of Artois, wife of the former,
Robert, Count of Clermont, son of Louis IX of France, founder of the house of Bourbon,
Louis I, Duke of Bourbon, son of the former,
Margaret of Clermont, sister of the former, wife of margrave John I, Marquis of Namur
Peter I, Duke of Bourbon, son of Louis I
Louis, younger son of Louis II, Duke of Bourbon,
Beatrice of Bourbon, daughter of Louis I, wife of Jean de Luxembourg then of Eudes II de Grancey,
Anne de Bourbon, Countess of Montpensier
Philip of Artois, elder son of Robert II, Count of Artois,
Blanche of Brittany, wife of the former,
Gaston I, Count of Foix,
Clementia of Hungary, second wife of Louis X of France,
the hearts of:
Philip III of France
Peter, fifth son of Louis IX,
Charles IV of France,
Philip III of Navarre, son of Louis, Count of Évreux,
Joan II of Navarre, wife of the former,
Charles I of Sicily, brother of Louis IX.
the guts of
king Philip V of France
Philip VI of France.

 Other tombs 
Humbert II, last Dauphin de Viennois,
cardinal Gui de Malsec,
Nicolas Coeffeteau and Noël Alexandre, Dominicans
Peter Paludanus, Latin Patriarch of Jerusalem
Agnès d'Orchies, Jeanne La Bricharde and Jeanne Roumaine, all three generals perpetual of the Béguines of Paris 
Jean Passerai, professor
George Critton, a Scottish doctor in civil and canon law and royal professor
Nicolas de Paris, substitute for the procureur-général du Parlement.
Claude Dormy, Bishop of Boulogne-sur-Mer, 
Pierre de Rostrenen, chamberlain to Charles VII,
the poet Jean de Meung, who continued the roman de la Rose''.

Notes and references 

Dominican monasteries in France
Christian monasteries in Paris
Former buildings and structures in Paris
Burial sites of the House of Valois-Alençon
Burial sites of the House of Valois
Buildings and structures demolished in the 19th century